Mikaela María Antonia "Mikee" de los Reyes Cojuangco-Jaworski (born February 26, 1974) is a Filipino sports official, equestrienne, model, former actress and television host. She was a gold medalist at the 2002 Asian Games in Busan, South Korea.

Early life
Cojuangco-Jaworski was born to Jose Cojuangco, Jr., former Congressman of Tarlac and Tingting Cojuangco, former Governor of Tarlac and now president of the Philippine Public Safety College. Her father is a member of the affluent Cojuangco family, who owns a 6,000-hectare sugar plantation known as Hacienda Luisita. She is the third of five daughters: Luisita C. Bautista, Josephine C. Guingona, Margarita Demetria C. Zini and Regina Patricia Jose Cojuangco. She is also a niece of former Philippine President Corazon Cojuangco-Aquino, first cousin of fellow actress Kris Aquino and former Philippine President Noynoy Aquino.

Her first rise to prominence was as a model for a Swatch commercial in 1991, where she appeared with Alvin Patrimonio.

She is a high school alumna of the Colegio San Agustin – Makati. She graduated with a Bachelor of Arts degree in Psychology from Ateneo de Manila University in 1996.

Equestrian and acting career
Cojuangco-Jaworski started to show interest in riding at age eight but was only allowed to take lessons by her parents when she turned 10. At the age of 16, she joined her first international competition at Shizuoka, Japan where she placed third in the individual show jumping. Her most significant victory was at the 2002 Asian Games in Busan, South Korea, at which she won the Philippines' third and last gold medal in the individual show jumping event.
In the mid 90's, Coujangco-Jaworksi would star in numerous action and romantic comedy movies. She starred in her own weekly drama anthology called Mikee on GMA Network, and also she starred in her first sitcom, Mikee Forever also aired on GMA-7.  She would later be paired with Cesar Montano and Aga Muhlach in two films. She, along with Donna Cruz and Regine Velasquez, starred in their namesake blockbuster movie Do Re Mi. The movie became a cult classic in the 90's and even launched a successful soundtrack.

She was later appointed as the flag bearer at the 2010 Asian Games despite not competing at the Games.

Cojuangco-Jaworski starred in the fantasy soap opera Magic Palayok aired on GMA Network.

On May 23, 2013, CEO of Goshen Land Capital, Inc, Alexander Bangsoy, announced that Cojuango-Jaworski will be the firm's celebrity endorser. Goshen Land Capital, Inc. is a Baguio-based real estate organization engaged in the development of residential subdivisions in prime locations in Baguio.

She became an IOC member at the 125th IOC Session held in Buenos Aires in September 2013. In 2020, she was elected to the IOC Executive Board to serve a five-year term.

Filmography

Personal life 
Cojuangco-Jaworski is also an actress and a commercial model. She is married to Pasig congressman Robert "Dodot" Jaworski, Jr., son of basketball player, senator Robert "Sonny" Jaworski. They have three sons named Robert Vincent Anthony III (Robbie), Rafael Joseph (Raf) and Renzo.

References

External links 
 
 Mikee Cojuangco-Jaworski's Official Website
 Sportshorsecm.com

1974 births
Ateneo de Manila University alumni
Filipino female equestrians
Cojuangco family
Living people
Sportspeople from Tarlac
Actresses from Tarlac
Filipino television personalities
International Olympic Committee members
Asian Games medalists in equestrian
Equestrians at the 1998 Asian Games
Equestrians at the 2002 Asian Games
Asian Games gold medalists for the Philippines
Asian Games silver medalists for the Philippines
Medalists at the 2002 Asian Games
Southeast Asian Games gold medalists for the Philippines
Southeast Asian Games competitors for the Philippines
Southeast Asian Games silver medalists for the Philippines
Southeast Asian Games medalists in equestrian
Competitors at the 2005 Southeast Asian Games
Filipino people of Polish descent
GMA Network personalities
Viva Artists Agency